Cossette may refer to:

In people:
 Jacques Cossette-Trudel (born 1947), convicted terrorist, Quebec separatist (FLQ), communication counsellor and filmmaker
 Marie-Andrée Cossette (born 1946), Canadian artist
 Pierre Cossette (born 1923), a TV executive producer and Broadway producer
 Sylvain Cossette (born 1963), a Canadian singer-songwriter

In other uses:
 Le Portrait de Petit Cossette, a manga and anime series 
 A by-product of sugar-beet processing (thin strips of sugar-beet), see Sugar beet

See also
Cosette, a fictional character from the novel, Les Misérables
Princess Rosa Cossette D'Elise, a fictional character from the video game Ace Combat 7: Skies Unknown